Hugh Patrick McDermott (20 March 1906 – 29 January 1972) was a British professional golfer turned actor who made a number of film, stage and television performances between 1936 and 1972. He specialised in playing Americans, so much so that most British film fans had no idea that he was actually Scottish.

Biography
He was born in Edinburgh, Scotland in 1906, and was educated in Davidson's Mains. Initially an instructor at the Royal Burgess Golfing Society of Edinburgh, he later toured South and Central America and won the Central America Open and later helped design a course in Guatemala.

A trip to the United States kindled his interest in the film industry, and he made his screen debut in Well Done, Henry and followed it up with an appearance as HM Stanley in David Livingstone.  In 1939 he appeared in the West End in N.C. Hunter's comedy Grouse in June. He made his final appearance in Chato's Land on film, and in The Amorous Prawn on stage in Edinburgh.

Filmography

 Well Done, Henry (1936) - Sevier
 The Captain's Table (1936) - Inspector Mooney
 David Livingstone (1936) - H.M. Stanley
 The Wife of General Ling (1937) - Tracy
 The Divorce of Lady X (1938) - Minor Role (uncredited)
 His Lordship Goes to Press (1938) - Reporter (uncredited)
 Hey! Hey! USA (1938) - Man on Phone (uncredited)
 The Saint in London (1939) - Tim - Kussella's Chauffeur (uncredited)
 Where's That Fire? (1940) - Jim Baker
 For Freedom (1940) - Sam
 Neutral Port (1940) - Jim Grey
 Spring Meeting (1941) - Michael Byrne
 "Pimpernel" Smith (1941) - David Maxwell 
 The Young Mr. Pitt (1942) - Mr. Melvill
 The Seventh Veil (1945) - Peter Gay
 This Man Is Mine (1946) - Bill Mackenzie
 No Orchids for Miss Blandish (1948) - Dave Fenner
 Good-Time Girl (1948) - Al Schwartz
 The Huggetts Abroad (1949) - Bob McCoy
 Lilli Marlene (1950) - Steve
 Two on the Tiles (1951) - Dick Lawson
 Four Days (1951) - Francis Templar
 Trent's Last Case (1952) - Calvin C. Bunner
 The Wedding of Lilli Marlene (1953) - Steve Moray
 The Love Lottery (1954) - Rodney Wheeler
 Night People (1954) - Maj. Burns
 Johnny on the Spot (1954) - Johnny Breakes
 Devil Girl from Mars (1954) - Michael Carter
 Malaga (1954) - Richard Farrell
 As Long as They're Happy (1955) - Barnaby Brady
 Thunder Rock (1955, TV film) - Streeter
 You Pay Your Money (1957) - Bob Westlake
 A King in New York (1957) - Bill Johnson (uncredited)
 The Man Who Wouldn't Talk (1958) - Bernie
 Delayed Flight (1964) - Lt. Col. Gavin Brampton
 First Men in the Moon (1964) - Richard Challis
 Bindle (1966) - American tourist
 The File of the Golden Goose (1969) - Ray Moss
 Guns in the Heather (1969) - Carleton
 The Adding Machine (1969) - Harry
 The Games (1970)
 Lawman (1971) - L.G. Moss
 Captain Apache (1971) - Gen. Ryland
 Chato's Land (1972) - Bartender (final film role)

References

External links

1906 births
1972 deaths
Scottish male stage actors
Scottish male film actors
Scottish male television actors
20th-century Scottish male actors
Scottish male golfers
Male actors from Edinburgh
Golfers from Edinburgh